Events from the year 1863 in Canada.

Incumbents
Monarch — Victoria

Federal government
Parliament — 7th then 8th

Governors
Governor General of the Province of Canada — Charles Monck, 4th Viscount Monck
Colonial Governor of Newfoundland — Alexander Bannerman
Governor of New Brunswick — Arthur Hamilton-Gordon, 1st Baron Stanmore
Governor of Nova Scotia — George Phipps, 2nd Marquess of Normanby
Governor of Prince Edward Island — George Dundas

Premiers
Joint Premiers of the Province of Canada –
John Sandfield Macdonald, Canada West Premier
Louis-Victor Sicotte, Canada East Premier until May 15, 1863
Antoine-Aimé Dorion, Canada East Premier on May 15, 1863
Premier of Newfoundland — Hugh Hoyles
Premiers of New Brunswick — Samuel Leonard Tilley
Premiers of Nova Scotia –
Joseph Howe (until June 5, 1863)
James William Johnston (on June 11, 1863)
Premier of Prince Edward Island –
Edward Palmer (before March 2, 1863)
John Hamilton Gray (on March 2, 1863)

Parliaments and Assemblies
7th Parliament of the Province of Canada
8th Parliament of the Province of Canada
19th New Brunswick Legislative Assembly
22nd General Assembly of Nova Scotia
21st General Assembly of Prince Edward Island
22nd General Assembly of Prince Edward Island

Events
March 17 — U.S. gives notice of intent to abrogate reciprocity.
September 5 — Louis-Victor Sicotte appointed a puisne judge of the Superior Court for Saint-Hyacinthe District
December 7 — New Brunswick and Nova Scotia: the Chesapeake Affair.
Militia Pay Act for all males 18–60.

Births
February 3 — James White, geographer
May 19 — John Alexander Mathieson, jurist, politician and Premier of Prince Edward Island (died 1947)
July 1 — William Grant Stairs, explorer, soldier and adventurer (died 1892)
October 4 — Peter Veniot, businessman, newspaper owner, politician and 17th Premier of New Brunswick (died 1936)
October 10 — Louis Cyr, strongman (died 1912)
November 14 — Edward Foster, fingerprint expert

Deaths
January 17 — Peter Warren Dease, HBC officer and Arctic explorer (born 1788)
January 31 — Sir John Robinson, 1st Baronet, of Toronto, lawyer, judge and political figure (born 1791)
November 20 — James Bruce, 8th Earl of Elgin, Governor General (born 1811)
December 10 — James FitzGibbon, British colonel who served in Canada for 45 years (born 1780)

Historical documents
Prevalence of death in girls among "imperfect" statistics from Indigenous schools and hospitals (Note: "uncivilized," other stereotypes)
Report on escaped slaves in Canada West says they are doing well 
Editorial on high rate of Canadian emigration to U.S.A.
Montreal doctor advocates making smallpox vaccination compulsory
Ice bridge forms on Niagara River

References
  

 
Canada
Years of the 19th century in Canada
1863 in North America